I Spy is a pop song which was released as the first single from Erica Baxter’s debut album Through My Eyes. The single was released on 14 October 2006.

"I Spy" was written by British singer, Natasha Bedingfield and Kevin D Hughes. The single featured two previously unreleased songs, "Fly Away" and "Paper Tiger" which both were co-written by Baxter.

Track listing

Chart performance
"I Spy" debuted at #72 on the Singles Chart in Australia, #13 on the Australasian Top 20 and #47 on the Physical Singles Chart. In its second week, "I Spy" moved up to #57 on the Singles Chart, it moved up to #12 from #13 on the Australasian Charts and moved up to #37 on the Physical Singles Chart. On its third week the single dropped out of the Top 100 Singles, dropped off the Australasian Charts and dropped to #98 on the Physical Singles Chart. The next week it failed to appear on any charts.

Charts

References

2006 singles
Songs written by Natasha Bedingfield